The 2008 Sydney to Hobart Yacht Race, sponsored by Rolex and hosted by Cruising Yacht Club of Australia  in Sydney, New South Wales, was the 64th annual running of the "blue water classic" Sydney to Hobart Yacht Race. The 2008 edition began on Sydney Harbour, at 1pm on Boxing Day (26 December 2008), before heading south for 630 nautical miles (1,170 km) through the Tasman Sea, past Bass Strait, into Storm Bay and up the River Derwent, to cross the finish line in Hobart, Tasmania. This marked the 10 year anniversary of the 1998 Sydney to Hobart Yacht Race, during which 6 sailors died due to a major storm.

The 2008 fleet comprised 100 starters; 92 finished. By placing first in line honours, Wild Oats XI became the first yacht to claim fourth consecutive line titles, beating the previous record held by Morna (later Kurrewa IV) of three consecutive line honours victories (1946, 1947 and 1948). Skipper Bob Steel and his yacht Quest won the Tattersall's Cup as the overall handicap winner.

2008 fleet
116 entered to participant and 100 started in the 2008 Sydney to Hobart Yacht race. They were:

Results

Line Honours results (Top 10)

Handicap results (Top 10)

References

Sydney to Hobart Yacht Race
Sydney to Hobart
Sydney to Hobart
December 2008 sports events in Australia